The Legend of Ben Hall is a 2016 Australian bushranger film. Written and directed by Matthew Holmes, it is based on the exploits of bushranger Ben Hall and his gang. The film stars Jack Martin in the title role, Jamie Coffa as John Gilbert, and William Lee as John Dunn.

Holmes' goal with The Legend of Ben Hall was to produce a historically accurate film that focuses on the last nine months of Hall's life, when he was a well-established bushranger along with his accomplices Gilbert and Dunn. It explores the relationships within the gang and depicts many of their robberies and clashes with the police. The film also explores the details surrounding Hall's betrayal and his controversial death at the hands of the police on 5 May 1865.

The film was shown on 12 October 2017 at the 7º Almería Western Film Festival.

Plot 
After two years on the road and with the law closing in around him, Ben Hall has gone in hiding and is considering surrender. However, he is drawn back into bushranging by the reappearance of his old friend and gang member, John Gilbert. Reforming the gang with a new recruit John Dunn, the trio soon become the most wanted men in Australian history after a series of robberies that result in the death of two policemen. Ben Hall also struggles to reconcile himself with his estranged son now living with his ex-wife and the man she eloped with many years earlier. When the Government moves to declare the gang outlaws, the gang make plans to flee the colony, but they are sold out by a trusted friend.

Cast 

 Jack Martin as Ben Hall
 Jamie Coffa as John Gilbert
 William Lee as John Dunn
 Joanne Dobbin as Biddy Hall
 Adam Willson as Mick Coneley
 Callan McAuliffe as Daniel Ryan
 Arthur Angel as Edward Morriss
 Andy McPhee as James 'Old Man' Gordon
 Erica Field as Mary Ann Coneley
 Lauren Grimson as Christina McKinnon
 PiaGrace Moon as Peggy Monks
 Lauren Gregory as Ellen Monks
 Jordan Fraser-Trumble as Sub-Inspector James Davidson
 Gregory Quinn as Sergeant James Condell
 John Orcsik as John Kelly

Production 
Production for The Legend of Ben Hall began in Melbourne in February 2015. Principal photography started on 29 March in Lauriston in regional Victoria and continued for over four weeks.
 Other locations included Nulla Vale, Spring Hill, Trentham and Maldon. Because the story is set in New South Wales, locations were selected to accurately represent various regions in New South Wales connected to the Ben Hall story, such as Forbes, Jugiong, Binalong and the Araluen Valley. Some scenes were filmed in New South Wales around Forbes and Jugiong.

Outdoor sets were constructed around the Lauriston area by Production Designer Das Patterson. The production also recycled existing film sets from previous film productions, such as The Man From Snowy River, which was also used in the American western television series Ponderosa. The now defunct Porcupine Historical Village at Maldon was also used for various indoor and outdoor scenes. Filming moved to the Melbourne Docklands Studios in May for another two weeks. The film's post production was completed in Melbourne on 5 May 2016, which coincided with the 151-year anniversary of shooting of Ben Hall at Billabong Creek on 5 May 1865.

Short film origin 
The Legend of Ben Hall started as a Kickstarter crowd-funded 40-minute short film, which exceeded its target production goal of $75,000.

American production company Palmarium LLC joined the project as producers, as did filmmaker Jessica Pearce, who stepped up from production manager to producer as the film geared up for filming. Victorian financier Ross Angelo also joined as a producer.

The production filmed for three weeks in August–September 2014. Locations included Lauriston, Trentham and Spring Hill in Victoria, as well as Jugiong and Forbes in New South Wales. The short film was financially supported by the Forbes Shire Council who believed in the film's potential to boost and promote tourism in the Forbes area due to its affiliation with Ben Hall history.

The project was picked up by Fox Studios Australia based producer Russell Cunningham from RLC Motion Picture Entertainment and Michael Favelle from Odin's Eye Entertainment, who came on board to develop the project as a full-length feature. The script was expanded with new characters and events so that the scenes already shot for the short film could be integrated into the feature. All of the short film cast reprised their roles, as did most of the film crew.

Historical accuracy 
Holmes sought to make the film as historically accurate as possible. Since 2007, he worked closely with New South Wales historian and author Peter Bradley, who acted as a historical advisor on the script to ensure the film's accurate portrayal of events. Bradley is a descendant of Ben Hall's younger brother, Henry Hall. Much of the dialogue used by Ben Hall, John Gilbert and John Dunn in the film comes directly from newspaper articles and eye-witness accounts. The film's story is based on real life events that occurred between August 1864 and May 1865.

Cast members were chosen to physically resemble their historical counterparts, with their personalities, wardrobe and hair based on descriptions or photographs of the real person.

Release 
The Legend of Ben Hall premiered in Forbes, New South Wales on 12 November 2016 at the Forbes Showgrounds. Almost 800 people attended the premiere. Forbes was chosen due to its historical affiliation with the outlaw and because the Forbes Shire Council had supported the project in its crowdfunding stage. The Forbes showgrounds are less than a kilometre from where Ben Hall is buried in the Forbes cemetery. The premiere was followed by an extensive two-week regional and metro tour throughout New South Wales, Queensland, Victoria and South Australia.

The Legend of Ben Hall had a limited theatrical release in Australia in December 2016. It was released on DVD, Blu-Ray and digital platforms on 2 March 2017. Distribution rights were picked up by Vega Baby for an 1 August 2017 release in North America. The film was also released in Germany in early 2017. It was to be released in the UK and Ireland on DVD by High Fliers Films PLC on 2 July. Both the North American Blu-Ray release and the Australian Blu-Ray release feature the 90-minute documentary Stand & Deliver: Making The Legend of Ben Hall, an in-depth look at how the film was conceived and its journey to completion.

Reception
The Legend of Ben Hall received mixed reviews, with several critics mentioning overly lengthy scenes, although its historical veracity was praised. On Rotten Tomatoes, the film has an approval rating of 50% based on 12 reviews, with an average score of 6.08/10. In 2020, it was listed amongst '10 Great Australian Westerns' in an article by the British Film Institute.

Awards and nominations
The score by Swiss-born composer Ronnie Minder was announced as one of the 145 scores eligible in the Best Original Score category in the 2017 Oscars by The Academy of Motion Picture Arts and Sciences. The film was declared "Best Foreign Western 2017" by True West Magazine and received the 'Audience Award' from the Cinema Australia website in 2016.

The Legend of Ben Hall has also participated in the following film festivals:
 19th Rencontres Internationales du Cinéma des Antipodes, Saint-Tropez 2017, France
 Made in Melbourne Film Festival 2016, Australia
 MonsterFest 2016, Australia
 7º Almeria Western Film Festival 2017, Spain
 Taoyuan Film Festival 2017, Taiwan
 Great Barrier Reef Film Festival 2017, Australia
 Vision Splendid Outback Film Festival 2017, Australia
 Rome Independent Cinema Festival 2018, Italy – Nominated for 'Best Foreign Film'

Planned anthology
Not long after its release, it was announced that the screenplays for a planned trilogy about bushranging in News South Wales had been written and were in the process of raising funds. Going under the umbrella title of The Legends Anthology, the next two films would be companion pieces to the Ben Hall story, following the criminal careers of Hall's former accomplices, Frank Gardiner and John Vane. Jack Martin and several of the other actors would reprise their roles in the new films, The Legend of Frank Gardiner and The Legend of John Vane. In 2021, director Matthew Holmes announced on Facebook that all plans for the prequel films had now shelved permanently.

References

Further reading
 Matthew Holmes' Ben Hall film puts bushrangers into focus (Sydney Morning Herald, 26 June 2016) 
 Bushranger film set to shoot (Inside Film, 19 February 2015)
 Gisborne actor lands lead role in the legend of Ben Hall bushranger movie (Herald Sun, 24 November 2014) 
 The Legend of Ben Hall (True West Magazine, November 2015)

External links 
 
 

2016 films
2016 biographical drama films
2016 drama films
2010s English-language films
2016 Western (genre) films
Australian Western (genre) films
Australian biographical drama films
Biographical films about bandits
Bushranger films
Films set in New South Wales
Films set in colonial Australia